Yelena Lvovna Shushunova (sometimes spelled Elena Shushunova; 23 May 1969 – 16 August 2018) was a Soviet Russian gymnast. Shushunova was one of five women (alongside Larisa Latynina, Věra Čáslavská, Ludmilla Tourischeva and Lilia Podkopayeva) who have won all-around titles at all major competitions: Olympics, World Championships and European/Continental Championships and one of ten women who medaled on every event at World Championships. 
Shushunova was renowned for pioneering complex skills as well as for her explosive and dynamic tumbling and high consistency.

Junior career 
Shushunova was born and grew up in Leningrad and began gymnastics when she was approximately six or seven years old. She began competing as a junior gymnast in 1981. In 1982, she won gold medals at the 1982 Moscow News (now known as Moscow Stars of the World) and the Junior European Championships.
In 1983, she won the USSR Cup, which she won every year until 1988 with the exception of 1984.

Senior career 
Shushunova was named as a member of the Soviet national gymnastics team in 1984, but was unable to compete at the 1984 Summer Olympics as the Soviet Union boycotted the Olympics. Instead, she competed at the 1984 Friendship Games in Olomouc, Czechoslovakia, where she finished third all around and helped the USSR to a gold in the team event.

The following year Shushunova made her breakthrough by winning the all-around title at the European Championships.  She also won three gold medals in the event finals on vault, floor exercise, and uneven bars (which she shared with East German Olympian Maxi Gnauck).  At the World Championships she won five medals including the all-around title, which she shared with compatriot Oksana Omelianchik.  She took first on vault, third on beam, and second on floor.  In her floor exercise she tumbled a double layout, and side Arabian 1 and 3/4 salto, both rare skills for women at that time; in fact, women are no longer allowed to compete saltos which end in a roll.  Here she displayed her signature skill, a straddle jump to prone support, a rare and innovative move for the 1980s.

Shushunova's dominance in women's gymnastics continued at the 1986 World Cup in Beijing.  There she won the all-around, vault, uneven bars, and floor exercise titles.  In this competition she displayed an increased level of difficulty on two apparatus, showing a Rulfova flic (full twisting Korbut flic) on balance beam and a tucked full in double salto dismount on the uneven bars. At the 1986 Goodwill Games she led the Soviet team to a gold medal, but then fell twice in the all-around finals to finish second to teammate Vera Kolesnikova. She rallied in the event finals to take, once again, the vault, bars, and floor golds and the beam silver.

In 1987, Shushunova lost the European title to Romanian Daniela Silivaș due to a fall on a double layout dismount from the uneven bars. At the European Championships she earned a bronze in the all-around and a gold on vault. She continued to show increased difficulty on all apparatus by competing a double layout dismount on the uneven bars, a layout Thomas salto on floor, and a full in dismount on beam.  Later that year her team lost the World Championships team title, placing second to the Romanian team. Shushunova also lost the world title to Romanian Aurelia Dobre, finishing in second place.  In the event finals she retained her vault title with her textbook Yurchenko full and Yurchenko 1.5, beating Romanian Eugenia Golea. She also earned a bronze medal on the uneven bars. Shushunova also earned silver on balance beam and tied with Daniela Silivas for gold on floor exercise.

1988 Olympics 
In 1988, Shushunova competed at the Summer Olympics in Seoul. She scored three perfect scores of 10 in optional events and won the individual all-around and team event titles. She also won silver on balance beam and bronze on uneven bars. Shushunova fell on a double twisting Yurchenko on vault and failed to medal. She also failed to medal on floor exercise due to stumbling out of the landing of her opening full-in double back and falling out of her arabian 1 3/4 salto .

Later life 
Shushunova retired from competition two months after the 1988 Olympics and later returned to her home city of Saint Petersburg, where she worked for the city's sports committee. She helped to organise the gymnastics events of the 1994 Goodwill Games and 1998 European Championships, both of which were held in Saint Petersburg.

In 2004, she was inducted into the International Gymnastics Hall of Fame. In the following year, she was inducted into the International Jewish Sports Hall of Fame.

Eponymous skills

Death
Shushunova died from complications of pneumonia on 16 August 2018.  She was 49.

Competitive history

See also

List of select Jewish gymnasts
List of top female medalists at the World Artistic Gymnastics Championships

References

External links
 
 Elena Shushunova at Gymn Forum
 Biography 
 Schuschunova element on the floor (3rd one in the sequence) – animated .gif
 
 

1969 births
2018 deaths
Deaths from pneumonia in Russia
Soviet female artistic gymnasts
Jewish gymnasts
Olympic gold medalists for the Soviet Union
Olympic silver medalists for the Soviet Union
Olympic bronze medalists for the Soviet Union
Olympic gymnasts of the Soviet Union
Gymnasts at the 1988 Summer Olympics
Soviet Jews
Russian Jews
Gymnasts from Saint Petersburg
World champion gymnasts
Medalists at the World Artistic Gymnastics Championships
Olympic medalists in gymnastics
European champions in gymnastics
Medalists at the 1988 Summer Olympics
Lesgaft National State University of Physical Education, Sport and Health alumni
International Jewish Sports Hall of Fame inductees
Honoured Masters of Sport of the USSR
Burials at Bogoslovskoe Cemetery
Competitors at the 1986 Goodwill Games
Goodwill Games medalists in gymnastics
Originators of elements in artistic gymnastics